Poslishtë(or Poslishta, serbian:Послиште, Poslište) is a village in the Prizren Municipality of Kosovo. The location is known for the nearby archaeological site, which was discovered in 2010.

Notes

References

External links
 Map

Villages in Prizren